The 1987 Baltimore mayoral election saw the election of Kurt Schmoke.

Incumbent mayor Clarence Burns was defeated in the Democratic primary.

Nominations
Primary elections were held September 15.

Democratic primary

Republican primary

General election
The general election was held November 3.

References

Baltimore mayoral
Mayoral elections in Baltimore
Baltimore